The Rose Hill Formation is a geologic formation in West Virginia, United States. It preserves fossils dating back to the Silurian period, and is a source of iron ore for nearby foundries.

History
The region has historically had numerous names by different geological agencies. West Virginia adopted the name Rose Hill Formation, and the name appears on the Geologic Map of West Virginia.

See also

 List of fossiliferous stratigraphic units in West Virginia

References

 

Silurian Maryland
Silurian West Virginia
Silurian geology of Pennsylvania
Silurian geology of Virginia
Silurian southern paleotemperate deposits